Rolf Holmström (7 September 1932 – 21 June 2012) was a Swedish footballer. Holmström played 12 games in the Swedish top flight in 1959 for GAIS, scoring three goals. He then also played four matches in the second flight for the club the next season before retiring. Before he played for GAIS, Holmström scored nine goals in a single second-flight game in a local derby against Skellefteå IF in 1958. Holmström died in June 2012, with his passing being reported by local Skellefteå newspaper Norran.

References

Årets Fotboll 1959 (Strömbergs Förlag AB) (Swedish)

1932 births
2012 deaths
GAIS players
Swedish footballers
Swedish bandy players
People from Skellefteå Municipality
Skellefteå FF players
Association football forwards
Sportspeople from Västerbotten County